Wang Hongyao (born November 1951) is a retired general of the Chinese People's Liberation Army (PLA). He served as Political Commissar of the PLA General Armaments Department, and its successor organization, the Equipment Development Department of the Central Military Commission, from 2011 to 2017.

Biography 
Wang Hongyao was born in November 1951 in Jining, Shandong Province. He holds a graduate degree from the PLA National Defence University.

Wang joined the PLA in December 1969, and served in the 199th division of the 67th Group Army. From 1993 to 1996 he worked in the political department of the 199th division. In 1996 he became the Political Commissar of the 162nd division of the 54th Group Army. From 2000 he served as Director of the Political Department, and then Political Commissar of the 54th Army. He became Director of the Political Department of the Shenyang Military Region in 2007, and Deputy Political Commissar in 2010. In 2011 he was appointed Political Commissar of the PLA General Armaments Department.

Wang Hongyao attained the rank of major general in July 2002 and lieutenant general in July 2009. On 31 July 2013, he was promoted to general (shangjiang), the highest rank for Chinese military officers in active service.

Wang was a member of the 18th Central Committee of the Chinese Communist Party (2012–2017).

References 

1951 births
Living people
People's Liberation Army generals from Shandong
People from Jining
PLA National Defence University alumni
Director of the political department of the Shenyang Military Region
Deputy political commissar of the Shenyang Military Region
Members of the 18th Central Committee of the Chinese Communist Party
Delegates to the 11th National People's Congress